Kontinuum is an Icelandic rock band. It is made up of Birgir Thorgeirsson, Engilbert Hauksson, Ingi Þór Pálsson, Erik Quick and Thorlakur Thor Gudmundsson.

The band was formed in Reykjavik in 2010 and started recording materials for their first album, Earth Blood Magic, released in 2012 receiving critical acclaim, and selected Icelandic Rock Album of the Year by Morgunblaðið newspaper. Kontinuum released their second album, Kyrr, in April, 2015. 
The bands third album, No Need to Reason was released in 2018

Discography

Albums
2012: Earth Blood Magic
2015: Kyrr
2018: No Need to Reason

Singles
2012: "Steinrunninn Skógur"
2012: "Moonshine"
2014: "Í Huldusal"
2014: "Breathe"
2018: "Two Moons"
2020: "Shivers"
2021: "Hjartavél"

References

External links
Facebook

Icelandic heavy metal musical groups
Musical groups from Reykjavík